The Château Malou (Dutch: Maloukasteel) is a neoclassical building in the municipality of Woluwe-Saint-Lambert in Brussels, Belgium.

History

The château was built in 1776 in the neoclassical style by a wealthy merchant called Lambert de Lamberts. The current building replaced a small 17th-century hunting lodge.

One of the château's owners was the orangist minister Pierre van Gobbelschroy, until the end of the Dutch period in 1829. After Belgium gained its independence from The United Kingdom of Netherlands, the château changed owners and eventually passed to the Finance Minister of the new Belgian government, Jules Malou (1810–1886). Malou occupied the building from 1853 onwards and the building has retained his name ever since.

The château is now the property of the municipality of Woluwe-Saint-Lambert and is primarily used for cultural activities, exhibitions, etc.

Location
The château is situated in the middle of Malou Park, overlooking the valley of the Woluwe stream. There is a formal lawn in front of the château, and beyond, there is a small lake with swans and ducks.

See also
List of castles in Belgium

References

External links

Woluwe-Saint-Lambert municipality official website 
Historical monuments of Woluwe-Saint-Lambert 
A picture gallery covering the Park and the Château

Houses completed in 1776
Malou
Malou
Woluwe-Saint-Lambert